

Peerage of England

|rowspan="2"|Duke of Cornwall (1337)||Edward of Westminster||1453||1471||Died, when his peerage dignities lapsed to the Crown
|-
|Edward Plantagenet||1470/1471||1483||Created Earl of March, and of Pembroke in 1479
|-
|Duke of Norfolk (1397)||John de Mowbray, 4th Duke of Norfolk||1461||1476||Died, title became extinct; Earldom of Norfolk succeeded by a daughter, see below
|-
|Duke of Buckingham (1444)||Henry Stafford, 2nd Duke of Buckingham||1460||1483||
|-
|Duke of Somerset (1448)||Edmund Beaufort, 3rd Duke of Somerset||1464||1471||Died, title became extinct
|-
|Duke of Suffolk (1448)||John de la Pole, 2nd Duke of Suffolk||1450||1491||
|-
|Duke of Clarence (1461)||George Plantagenet, 1st Duke of Clarence||1461||1478||Created Earl of Salisbury, and of Warwick in 1472; attained, and all his honours became forfeited
|-
|Duke of Gloucester (1461)||Richard Plantagenet, 1st Duke of Gloucester||1461||1483||
|-
|Duke of Bedford (1470)||George Neville, 1st Duke of Bedford||1470||1478||New creation; degraded from his peerage
|-
|Duke of York (1474)||Richard of Shrewsbury, 1st Duke of York||1474||1483||New creation; 1st Duke of Norfolk (1477), 1st Earl of Nottingham (1476), 1st Earl Warenne (1477)
|-
|Marquess of Montagu (1470)||John Neville, 1st Marquess of Montagu||1470||1471||New creation; attainted and his honours became forfeited
|-
|Marquess of Dorset (1475)||Thomas Grey, 1st Marquess of Dorset||1475||1501||New creation
|-
|Earl of Warwick (1088)||Anne Neville, 16th Countess of Warwick and Richard Neville, 16th Earl of Warwick||14481449||14921471||
|-
|Earl of Arundel (1138)||William FitzAlan, 16th Earl of Arundel||1438||1487||
|-
|Earl of Oxford (1142)||John de Vere, 13th Earl of Oxford||1462||1474||Attainted
|-
|Earl of Norfolk (1312)||Anne de Mowbray, 8th Countess of Norfolk||1476||1481||
|-
|Earl of Devon (1335)||John Courtenay, 7th Earl of Devon||1470||1471||Restored; died, titles fell in abeyance
|-
|Earl of Salisbury (1337)||Richard Neville, 6th Earl of Salisbury||1462||1471||Died, titles fell in abeyance
|-
|Earl of Westmorland (1397)||Ralph Neville, 2nd Earl of Westmorland||1425||1484||
|-
|Earl of Northumberland (1416)||Henry Percy, 4th Earl of Northumberland||1470||1489||Restored
|-
|rowspan="2"|Earl of Shrewsbury (1442)||John Talbot, 3rd Earl of Shrewsbury||1460||1473||Died
|-
|George Talbot, 4th Earl of Shrewsbury||1473||1538||
|-
|rowspan="2"|Earl of Worcester (1449)||John Tiptoft, 1st Earl of Worcester||1449||1470||Attainted
|-
|Edward Tiptoft, 2nd Earl of Worcester||1471||1485||Restored
|-
|Earl of Richmond (1452)||Henry Tudor, Earl of Richmond||1456||1485||
|-
|Earl of Essex (1461)||Henry Bourchier, 1st Earl of Essex||1461||1483||
|-
|Earl of Kent (1465)||Edmund Grey, 1st Earl of Kent||1465||1490||
|-
|Earl Rivers (1465)||Anthony Woodville, 2nd Earl Rivers||1469||1483||
|-
|Earl of Lincoln (1467)||John de la Pole, 1st Earl of Lincoln||1467||1487||
|-
|Earl of Pembroke (1469)||William Herbert, 2nd Earl of Pembroke||1469||1479||Surrendered peerage
|-
|rowspan="2"|Earl of Wiltshire (1470)||John Stafford, 1st Earl of Wiltshire||1470||1473||New creation; died
|-
|Edward Stafford, 2nd Earl of Wiltshire||1473||1499||
|-
|Earl of Huntingdon (1471)||Thomas Grey, 1st Earl of Huntingdon||1471||1475||New creation; resigned, and was created Marquess of Dorset
|-
|Earl of Winchester (1472)||Lewis de Bruges, 1st Earl of Winchester||1472||1492||New creation
|-
|Earl of Salisbury (1478)||Edward Plantagenet, Earl of Salisbury||1476||1484||New creation
|-
|Earl of Huntingdon (1479)||William Herbert, 1st Earl of Huntingdon||1479||1491||New creation
|-
|Viscount Beaumont (1440)||William Beaumont, 2nd Viscount Beaumont||1460||1507||Attainted 1471-1485
|-
|Viscount Lisle (1451)||Thomas Talbot, 2nd Viscount Lisle||1453||1470||Died, title extinct
|-
|Baron de Ros (1264)||Edmund de Ros, 10th Baron de Ros||1464||1508||Under attainder until 1485
|-
|Baron Dynham (1295)||John Dynham, 8th or 1st Baron Dynham||1467||1501||
|-
|Baron Fauconberg (1295)||Joan Neville, 6th Baroness Fauconberg||1429||1490||
|-
|Baron FitzWalter (1295)||Elizabeth Radcliffe, suo jure Baroness FitzWalter||1431||1485||
|-
|rowspan="3"|Baron FitzWarine (1295)||Thomazine FitzWarine, suo jure Baroness FitzWarine||1433||1471||Died
|-
|Fulk Bourchier, 10th Baron FitzWarin||1471||1479||Died
|-
|John Bourchier, 11th Baron FitzWarin||1479||1539||
|-
|Baron Grey de Wilton (1295)||Reginald Grey, 7th Baron Grey de Wilton||1442||1493||
|-
|Baron Clinton (1299)||John Clinton, 6th Baron Clinton||1464||1488||
|-
|rowspan="2"|Baron De La Warr (1299)||Richard West, 7th Baron De La Warr||1450||1476||Died
|-
|Thomas West, 8th Baron De La Warr||1476||1525||
|-
|Baron Ferrers of Chartley (1299)||John Devereux, 9th Baron Ferrers of Chartley||1468||1501||
|-
|Baron Lovel (1299)||Francis Lovel, 9th Baron Lovel||1465||1485||
|-
|Baron Scales (1299)||Elizabeth de Scales Woodville, Baroness Scales||1460||1473||Died, Barony fell into abeyance
|-
|Baron Ferrers of Groby (1299)||Elizabeth Ferrers, 6th Baroness Ferrers of Groby||1445||1483||
|-
|rowspan="2"|Baron Morley (1299)||Alianore Lovel, 7th Baroness Morley||1442||1476||Died
|-
|Henry Lovel, 8th Baron Morley||1476||1489||
|-
|rowspan="2"|Baron Strange of Knockyn (1299)||John le Strange, 8th Baron Strange||1449||1470||Died
|-
|Joan le Strange, 9th Baroness Strange||1470||1514||
|-
|Baron Zouche of Haryngworth (1308)||John la Zouche, 7th Baron Zouche||1468||1526||
|-
|Baron Audley of Heleigh (1313)||John Tuchet, 6th Baron Audley||1459||1490||
|-
|Baron Cobham of Kent (1313)||John Brooke, 7th Baron Cobham||1464||1512||
|-
|rowspan="3"|Baron Willoughby de Eresby (1313)||Robert Welles, 8th Baron Willoughby de Eresby||1462||1470||Died
|-
|Joan Welles, 9th Baroness Willoughby de Eresby||1470||1475||Died
|-
|Christopher Willoughby, 10th Baron Willoughby de Eresby||1475||1499||
|-
|Baron Dacre (1321)||Joan Dacre, 7th Baroness Dacre||1458||1486||
|-
|rowspan="2"|Baron FitzHugh (1321)||Henry FitzHugh, 5th Baron FitzHugh||1452||1472||Died
|-
|Richard FitzHugh, 6th Baron FitzHugh||1472||1487||
|-
|Baron Greystock (1321)||Ralph de Greystock, 5th Baron Greystock||1436||1487||
|-
|Baron Harington (1326)||Cecily Bonville, 7th Baroness Harington||1460||1530||
|-
|Baron Poynings (1337)||Eleanor Percy, 6th Baroness Poynings||1446||1482||
|-
|rowspan="2"|Baron Scrope of Masham (1350)||Thomas Scrope, 5th Baron Scrope of Masham||1455||1475||Died
|-
|Thomas Scrope, 6th Baron Scrope of Masham||1475||1493||
|-
|rowspan="2"|Baron Botreaux (1368)||Margaret Hungerford, 4th Baroness Botreaux||1462||1477||Died
|-
|Mary Hungerford, 5th Baroness Botreaux||1477||1520||
|-
|Baron Scrope of Bolton (1371)||John Scrope, 5th Baron Scrope of Bolton||1459||1498||
|-
|Baron Lumley (1384)||Thomas Lumley, 2nd Baron Lumley||1461||1480||
|-
|Baron Bergavenny (1392)||George Nevill, 4th Baron Bergavenny||1447||1492||
|-
|Baron Grey of Codnor (1397)||Henry Grey, 4th Baron Grey of Codnor||1444||1496||
|-
|Baron Berkeley (1421)||William de Berkeley, 2nd Baron Berkeley||1463||1492||
|-
|Baron Latimer (1432)||Richard Neville, 2nd Baron Latimer||1469||1530||
|-
|Baron Dudley (1440)||John Sutton, 1st Baron Dudley||1440||1487||
|-
|Baron Sudeley (1441)||Ralph Boteler, 1st Baron Sudeley||1441||1473||Died, title extinct
|-
|Baron Lisle (1444)||Elizabeth Talbot, 3rd Baroness Lisle||1475||1487||Title previously held by Viscounts Lisle
|-
|rowspan="3"|Baron Saye and Sele (1447)||William Fiennes, 2nd Baron Saye and Sele||1450||1471||Died
|-
|Henry Fiennes, 3rd Baron Saye and Sele||1471||1476||Died
|-
|Richard Fiennes, 4th Baron Saye and Sele||1476||1501||
|-
|rowspan="2"|Baron Beauchamp of Powick (1447)||John Beauchamp, 1st Baron Beauchamp of Powick||1447||1475||Died
|-
|Richard Beauchamp, 2nd Baron Beauchamp||1475||1503||
|-
|rowspan="2"|Baron Stourton (1448)||William Stourton, 2nd Baron Stourton||1462||1479||
|-
|John Stourton, 3rd Baron Stourton||1479||1485||
|-
|Baron Bergavenny (1450)||Edward Nevill, 1st Baron Bergavenny||1450||1476||Died, Barony succeeded by his son, Baron Bergavenny (1392 creation), see above
|-
|rowspan="2"|Baron Berners (1455)||John Bourchier, 1st Baron Berners||1455||1474||Died
|-
|John Bourchier, 2nd Baron Berners||1474||1533||
|-
|Baron Stanley (1456)||Thomas Stanley, 2nd Baron Stanley||1459||1504||
|-
|Baron Neville (1459)||Ralph Neville, 2nd Baron Neville||1472||1499||Attainder reversed in 1472
|-
|Baron Montagu (1461)||John Neville, 1st Baron Montagu||1461||1471||Created Marquess of Montagu in 1471, both titles forfeited in 1471
|-
|Baron Cromwell (1461)||Humphrey Bourchier, 1st Baron Cromwell||1461||1471||Died, title extinct
|-
|Baron Hastings de Hastings (1461)||William Hastings, 1st Baron Hastings||1461||1483||
|-
|Baron Ogle (1461)||Owen Ogle, 2nd Baron Ogle||1469||1485||
|-
|Baron Wenlock (1461)||John Wenlock, 1st Baron Wenlock||1461||1471||Died, title extinct
|-
|rowspan="3"|Baron Mountjoy (1465)||Walter Blount, 1st Baron Mountjoy||1465||1474||Died
|-
|Edward Blount, 2nd Baron Mountjoy||1474||1475||Died
|-
|John Blount, 3rd Baron Mountjoy||1475||1485||
|-
|Baron Howard (1470)||John Howard, 1st Baron Howard||1470||1485||New creation
|-
|Baron Dacre of Gilsland (1473)||Humphrey Dacre, 1st Baron Dacre||1473||1485||New creation
|-
|}

Peerage of Scotland

|Duke of Rothesay (1398)||James Stewart, Duke of Rothesay||1473||1488||
|-
|Duke of Albany (1456)||Alexander Stewart, Duke of Albany||1456||1483||
|-
|Earl of Ross (1215)||John of Islay, Earl of Ross||1449||1476||Surrendered the Earldom to the Crown and created Lord of the Isles (below)
|-
|Earl of Sutherland (1235)||John de Moravia, 8th Earl of Sutherland||1460||1508||
|-
|Earl of Orkney (1379)||William Sinclair, Earl of Orkney||1410||1470||Resigned the Earldom
|-
|Earl of Angus (1389)||Archibald Douglas, 5th Earl of Angus||1463||1513||
|-
|Earl of Crawford (1398)||David Lindsay, 5th Earl of Crawford||1453||1495||
|-
|Earl of Menteith (1427)||Malise Graham, 1st Earl of Menteith||1427||1490||
|-
|rowspan=2|Earl of Huntly (1445)||Alexander Gordon, 1st Earl of Huntly||1445||1470||Died
|-
|George Gordon, 2nd Earl of Huntly||1470||1501||
|-
|rowspan=2|Earl of Erroll (1452)||Nicholas Hay, 2nd Earl of Erroll||1462||1470||Died
|-
|William Hay, 3rd Earl of Erroll||1470||1507||
|-
|rowspan=2|Earl of Caithness (1455)||William Sinclair, 1st Earl of Caithness||1455||1476||Resigned
|-
|William Sinclair, 2nd Earl of Caithness||1476||1513||
|-
|Earl of Argyll (1457)||Colin Campbell, 1st Earl of Argyll||1457||1493||
|-
|Earl of Atholl (1457)||John Stewart, 1st Earl of Atholl||1457||1512||
|-
|Earl of Morton (1458)||James Douglas, 1st Earl of Morton||1458||1493||
|-
|Earl of Rothes (1458)||George Leslie, 1st Earl of Rothes||1458||1490||
|-
|Earl Marischal (1458)||William Keith, 2nd Earl Marischal||1463||1483||
|-
|Earl of Mar and Garioch (1459)||John Stewart, Earl of Mar and Garioch||1459||1479||Died, title extinct
|-
|Earl of Buchan (1469)||James Stewart, 1st Earl of Buchan||1469||1499||
|-
|Lord Erskine (1429)||Thomas Erskine, 2nd Lord Erskine||1453||1494||de jure Earl of Mar
|-
|Lord Somerville (1430)||John Somerville, 3rd Lord Somerville||1456||1491||
|-
|Lord Haliburton of Dirleton (1441)||George Haliburton, 4th Lord Haliburton of Dirleton||1459||1492||
|-
|Lord Forbes (1442)||William Forbes, 3rd Lord Forbes||1462||1483||
|-
|Lord Crichton (1443)||William Crichton, 3rd Lord Crichton||1454||1484||
|-
|rowspan=2|Lord Hamilton (1445)||James Hamilton, 1st Lord Hamilton||1445||1479||Died
|-
|James Hamilton, 2nd Lord Hamilton||1479||1529||
|-
|Lord Maxwell (1445)||Robert Maxwell, 2nd Lord Maxwell||1454||1485||
|-
|Lord Glamis (1445)||Alexander Lyon, 2nd Lord Glamis||1459||1486||
|-
|rowspan=2|Lord Graham (1445)||William Graham, 2nd Lord Graham||1466||1472||Died
|-
|William Graham, 3rd Lord Graham||1472||1513||
|-
|Lord Lindsay of the Byres (1445)||John Lindsay, 1st Lord Lindsay||1445||1482||
|-
|Lord Saltoun (1445)||William Abernethy, 2nd Lord Saltoun||1460||1488||
|-
|Lord Gray (1445)||Andrew Gray, 2nd Lord Gray||1469||1514||
|-
|rowspan=2|Lord Montgomerie (1449)||Alexander Montgomerie, 1st Lord Montgomerie||1449||1470||Died
|-
|Hugh Montgomerie, 2nd Lord Montgomerie||1470||1545||
|-
|Lord Sinclair (1449)||William Sinclair, 1st Lord Sinclair||1449||1484||Previously Earl of Caithness and Orkney
|-
|Lord Fleming (1451)||Robert Fleming, 1st Lord Fleming||1451||1494||
|-
|rowspan=2|Lord Seton (1451)||George Seton, 1st Lord Seton||1451||1478||Died
|-
|George Seton, 2nd Lord Seton||1478||1508||
|-
|rowspan=2|Lord Borthwick (1452)||William Borthwick, 1st Lord Borthwick||1452||1470||Died
|-
|William Borthwick, 2nd Lord Borthwick||1470||1484||
|-
|Lord Boyd (1454)||Robert Boyd, 1st Lord Boyd||1454||1482||
|-
|Lord Oliphant (1455)||Laurence Oliphant, 1st Lord Oliphant||1455||1498||
|-
|Lord Kennedy (1457)||Gilbert Kennedy, 1st Lord Kennedy||1457||1489||
|-
|Lord Livingston (1458)||James Livingston, 2nd Lord Livingston||1467||1497||
|-
|Lord Hailes (1458)||Patrick Hepburn, 1st Lord Hailes||1458||1483||
|-
|Lord Avandale (1459)||Andrew Stewart, 1st Lord Avandale||1459||1488||
|-
|Lord Cathcart (1460)||Alan Cathcart, 1st Lord Cathcart||1460||1497||
|-
|Lord Darnley (1460)||John Stewart, 1st Baron Darnley||1460||1495||
|-
|Lord Lovat (1464)||Hugh Fraser, 1st Lord Lovat||1464||1500||
|-
|Lord Innermeath (1470)||Walter Stewart, 1st Lord Innermeath||1470||1489||New creation
|-
|Lord Carlyle of Torthorwald (1473)||John Carlyle, 1st Lord Carlyle||1473||1501||New creation
|-
|Lord Home (1473)||Alexander Home, 1st Lord Home||1473||1490||New creation
|-
|Lord of the Isles (1476)||John of Islay, 1st Lord of the Isles||1476||1498||New creation for the former Earl of Ross (above)
|-
|}

Peerage of Ireland

|rowspan=2|Earl of Kildare (1316)||Thomas FitzGerald, 7th Earl of Kildare||1434||1478||Died
|-
|Gerald FitzGerald, 8th Earl of Kildare||1478||1513||
|-
|rowspan=2|Earl of Ormond (1328)||John Butler, 6th Earl of Ormond||1461||1478||Died
|-
|Thomas Butler, 7th Earl of Ormond||1478||1515||
|-
|Earl of Desmond (1329)||James FitzGerald, 8th Earl of Desmond||1468||1487||
|-
|rowspan=2|Earl of Waterford (1446)||John Talbot, 3rd Earl of Waterford||1460||1473||Died
|-
|George Talbot, 4th Earl of Waterford||1473||1538||
|-
|Viscount Gormanston (1478)||Robert Preston, 1st Viscount Gormanston||1478||1503||New creation
|-
|rowspan=2|Baron Athenry (1172)||Thomas II de Bermingham||1428||1473||Died
|-
|Thomas III de Bermingham||1473||1500||
|-
|rowspan=2|Baron Kingsale (1223)||Nicholas de Courcy, 12th Baron Kingsale||1460||1476||Died
|-
|James de Courcy, 13th Baron Kingsale||1476||1499||
|-
|Baron Kerry (1223)||Edmond Fitzmaurice, 9th Baron Kerry||1469||1498||
|-
|Baron Barry (1261)||William Barry, 8th Baron Barry||1420||1480||
|-
|Baron Gormanston (1370)||Robert Preston, 4th Baron Gormanston||1450||1503||Created Viscount Gormanston, see above
|-
|rowspan=2|Baron Slane (1370)||Thomas Fleming, 6th Baron Slane||1463||1470||Died
|-
|James Fleming, 7th Baron Slane||1470||1492||
|-
|Baron Howth (1425)||Robert St Lawrence, 3rd Baron Howth||1465||1485||
|-
|Baron Killeen (1449)||Edmond Plunkett, 4th Baron Killeen||1469||1510||
|-
|rowspan=2|Baron Trimlestown (1461)||Robert Barnewall, 1st Baron Trimlestown||1461||1470||Died
|-
|Christopher Barnewall, 2nd Baron Trimlestown||1470||1513||
|-
|Baron Dunsany (1462)||Richard Plunkett, 2nd Baron of Dunsany||1463||1480||
|-
|Baron Portlester (1462)||Rowland FitzEustace, 1st Baron Portlester||1462||1496||
|-
|Baron Ratoath (1468)||Robert Bold, 1st Baron Ratoath||1468||1479||Died, title extinct
|-
|}

References

 

Lists of peers by decade
1470s in England
1470s in Ireland
15th century in England
15th century in Scotland
15th century in Ireland
15th-century English nobility
15th-century Scottish peers
15th-century Irish people
Peers